A list of notable film actors from Luxembourg:

B 
 Marc Baum (b. 1978)

D 
 Germaine Damar (b. 1929)
 René Deltgen (1909–1979)

G 
 Pol Greisch (b. 1930)

J 
 André Jung (1953)

K 
 Vicky Krieps (b. 1983)

L 
 Sascha Ley (b. 1967)

M 
 Myriam Muller (b. 1971)

N 
 Désirée Nosbusch (b. 1965)

V 
 Thierry van Werveke (1958–2009)

References

 
Luxem
Lux
Film actors